{{Infobox film
| name           = Bala
| image          = Bala Film Poster.jpg
| caption        = Theatrical release poster
| director       = Amar Kaushik
| producer       = Dinesh Vijan
| writer         = Vikas Taliyan'Story, Screenplay and Dialogues:Niren BhattAdditional Screenplay:Ravi MuppaOriginal Story:Pavel Bhattacharjee
| narrator       = Vijay Raaz
| starring       = 
| music          = Songs and Original Score:Sachin–JigarGuest Composers:JaaniB Praak
| cinematography = Anuj Rakesh Dhawan
| editing        = Hemanti Sarkar
| studio         = Maddock FilmsJio Studios
| distributor    = AA Films
| released       = 8 November 2019
| runtime        = 133 minutes
| country        = India
| language       = Hindi
| gross          =  crore
}}Bala''' is a 2019 Hindi-language satirical black comedy film directed by Amar Kaushik and produced by Dinesh Vijan, based on an original story by Bengali film director Pavel Bhattacharjee. It stars Ayushmann Khurrana, Bhumi Pednekar and Yami Gautam.Bala revolves around the protagonist Balmukund Shukla, a young man living in Kanpur who is suffering from male pattern baldness, and the story is about his lack of confidence and societal pressure that comes with premature balding. It focuses on the social issues of baldness and colourism. Principal photography of the film took place from May to July 2019 in Kanpur, Mumbai and Lucknow. The soundtrack album was composed by Sachin–JigarBala was released in preview shows on 7 November 2019 and theatrically worldwide on 8 November 2019. It was a critical and commercial success. The film emerged as a blockbuster with global earnings of 172 crore. Bala was showcased in Indo-German Filmweek 2020 in Berlin on 27 September 2020.

At the 65th Filmfare Awards, Bala received 3 nominations, including Best Actor (Khurrana) and Best Supporting Actress (Pahwa).

 Plot 
The film opens in Kanpur in 2005, where 14-year-old students tease a bald teacher. Balmukund "Bala" Shukla, a popular kid who carries much pride for his hairstyle, leads the teasing of the teacher. Bala borrows notes from the studious and dark-complexioned Latika Trivedi who was good in studies and passes them off as his own to the fair-skinned Shruti to impress her by pasting a new sticker bearing his name above Latika's notebook. When Latika calls him out and open up the sticker in front of Shruti, Bala berates her for being dark-skinned. The narrator describes how society values beauty and fair skin over other accomplishments, especially in marriage.

14 years later, Bala is a balding man in his late twenties who struggles with his premature baldness. He is a fairness cream salesman by day and nightclub comic by night. One day, Bala angrily lashes out at his bald father Hari, who is a ghar jamai, that the father's balding genes have killed the son's prospects. Hari presents him with a wig and explains that baldness is external and need not have anything to do with one's accomplishments. Bala dons the wig and resumes his work with new vigor. He finally meets his crush, a pretty, fair-skinned model, Pari Mishra, and courts her. They decide to marry. Some days before the wedding, Bala is stricken by conscience and sends her a text disclosing his baldness. Unbeknownst to him, the text accidentally goes to someone else and Pari does not see it. Bala assumes she has accepted his baldness and they marry.

Latika has her share of troubles. Many boys and families come to see her but reject her because of her dark skin. Among these prospective suitors is Rohan, an Australia-settled NRI who is attracted to Latika but the meeting blows over when his mother mentions Latika's complexion and Latika storms out. Rohan asks to meet her and they reconcile until he mentions he was initially attracted to her due to her Instagram profile. Latika reveals that she is not on Instagram, and it is revealed that Bala had created a fake profile with airbrushed pictures of her at her aunt's behest.

Fuming, Latika storms into Bala's home the day after his wedding and shouts at him. She says she is not ashamed of her skin and warns him not to interfere in her life anymore. Pari hears this, discovers Bala's baldness, and walks out on him. Bala is dejected. Bala visits her to talk it over. Pari reveals that she was blessed with good looks but not much else. She knew she was a below-average student and thus could not enter any other profession besides modeling. Her looks are all she has: they are the source of the attention she's received all her life and the source of her livelihood. He later receives a court notice: Pari wants the marriage annulled.

Latika apologizes to Bala, as her outburst broke his marriage. Bala engages her as his lawyer and the court case begins. Latika cross-examines Pari, who accepts she married Bala because of his wits and charm. She also accepts that Bala did not mislead or defraud her but points out that Bala was not forthcoming about his baldness, claiming that if he isn't comfortable with himself, he can't sustain anyone else. Pari’s lawyer moves that Pari has a right to want to annul the marriage regardless. Bala interrupts the proceedings and agrees that Pari does have that right and the judge orders such. When Latika questions him later, Bala explains that the law cannot compel anyone to love another, and a half-hearted marriage will not work anyway.

Later, during one of his fair-cream sales events, Bala realizes that beauty is merely skin-deep. He publicly sheds his wig to show that self-love is important irrespective of appearance. He also realizes that he has fallen in love with Latika and runs to propose to her but sees that Rohan and his family have come to finalize the wedding. He proposes to Latika, but is disheartened when she rejects his proposal, though they are able to resume their friendship.

The film ends with Bala, now at peace with his baldness, doing a new comedy routine about skin-deep beauty and the meaning of life.

Cast

Production

Casting

The cast of the film was announced by producer Dinesh Vijan. The film, directed by Amar Kaushik, was publicized to star Ayushmann Khurrana in the titular role, Yami Gautam as a model based in Lucknow and Bhumi Pednekar as a dusky small town educated woman.

Filming

Principal photography began on 6 May 2019, and film was shot in Mumbai, Lucknow and Kanpur. Filming concluded on 7 July 2019, with a special party for the wrap up.

Soundtrack

The music and background score is composed by Sachin–Jigar, with guest composers Jaani and B Praak composing the song "Naah Goriye" which is a recreated version of the song "Naah" by the same artists released in 2017 while lyrics have been written by Mellow D, Jaani, Badshah, Priya Saraiya, Jigar Saraiya and Bhargav Purohit, a debutante. Vocals were provided by Saraiya, Badshah, Shalmali Kholgade, Gurdeep Mehndi, Divya Kumar, Asees Kaur, Jubin Nautiyal, Papon, Harrdy Sandhu and Swasti Mehul, thus marking the second instance after Dum Laga Ke Haisha to not have Ayushmann Khurrana sing for any of his films.

The song "Don't Be Shy Again" is from an original track of the same title from the album 'Rouge' by Rouge, composed by Dr Zeus and written by Lola Olafis. This is the second time the song is being recreated after 2015's film Alone which was titled 'Touch My Body', sung by Aditi Singh Sharma and picturised on Bipasha Basu.

Marketing and release
The theme poster of Bala was released on 27 May giving release date.

With the release of theatrical poster the release date was changed, the film was released in preview shows on 7 November 2019 and theatrically released in India on 8 November 2019.

Controversies
After the trailer of the film was released, it was accused of copyright violation from the makers of Ujda Chaman, which also has a storyline similar to Bala. Ujda Chaman is an official remake of Kannada film Ondu Motteya Kathe.

On release of its first song "Don't Be Shy", music composer-singer Dr Zeus claimed that the makers have used his track without giving due credit and acquiring any sort of rights.

Reception

Critical responseBala received generally positive reviews from critics with praise for the performances and the film's narrative.Bollywood Hungama gave 3.5 out of 5 and said, "Bala not only entertains thoroughly but also delivers a very important message that will surely be lapped up by the audiences." Ronak Kotecha of The Times of India rated the movie 4 stars on five and wrote, "'Bala' remains a light-hearted comedy with situations that are relatable. Just like the film's message, 'Bala' is beautiful even with its flaws, and never fails to entertain." Monika Rawal Kukreja of Hindustan Times reviewed, "Bala is a well-made film that stays true to its genre for most of the time. It makes right jokes at the time and leaves you in stitches more often that you’d expect."

Anna M. M. Vetticad of Firstpost praised the use of Kanpuriya Hindi in the film, but was critical of its messaging, writing, “No one on Team Bala seems to have detected the irony in casting a light-skinned actor as Latika and painting her face black, rather than casting a black woman to play a black woman.” Kennith Rosario of The Hindu said, "A hollow film combed over with humour." India Today rated the movie 4 on 5 and said, "King Midas Ayushmann Khurrana delivers another blockbuster." News18 rated the movie 3 on 5 and said, "Bala could have been a crackerjack of a film but allows the novelty of its premise to wear out too easily. Bala, Kanpur’s “edible young man” (sic), certainly gets your attention, but does not manage to sweep you off your feet."

Box officeBala''s opening day domestic collection was 10.15 crore. On the second day, the film collected 15.73 crore. On the third day, the film collected 18.07 crore, taking total opening weekend collection to 439.5 million.

, the film grossed 139.02 crore in India and 32.43 crore overseas for a worldwide gross of 171.5 crore.

See also
 Kubja, referenced several times in the film

References

External links
 
 
 

2019 films
Indian black comedy films
2010s Hindi-language films
Fiction about diseases and disorders
Discrimination based on skin color
Films set in Kanpur
Films set in Lucknow
Films shot in Kanpur
Films shot in Lucknow
Films shot in Mumbai